Exochiko (before 1957: Κατσίμπαλης – Katsimpalis) is a village in the municipal unit of Filiatra in western Messenia, Greece. Its population is 179 people (2011 census). Exochiko is situated near the Ionian Sea coast, at 60 m elevation. It is 4 km north of Filiatra, 10 km southwest of Kyparissia and 50 km northwest of Kalamata. The Greek National Road 9 (Pyrgos – Kyparissia – Pylos – Methoni) passes west of the village.

Population

History
The origin of the former name Katsimpalis may have been a Turkish local leader Katsibali (Kacibal, Kacibali?), or a companion of revolutionary leader Theodoros Kolokotronis that was named Katsibali. Exochiko was founded by Arcadians in the mid 19th century, most of these arrived from Alonistaina. Its residents are employed in agriculture including olive oil production, groves and greenhouses.

See also

List of settlements in Messenia

References

External links
Exochiko Trifyllias at the GTP Travel Pages

Populated places in Messenia